The 1939–40 Lafayette Leopards men's ice hockey season was the 3rd season of play for the program. The Leopards represented Lafayette College and were coached by Henry W. Clark in his 4th seasons.

Season
After a year as an unofficial squad, the schools announced that they would be recognizing the ice hockey team as official representatives of the school in November 1939. Now fully supported by the school the team was able to join the Hershey Intercollegiate League made up of other clubs in eastern Pennsylvania. While Lafayette was the only varsity program of the lot, they would play against several other colleges throughout the year. With the early announcement, Lafayette was also able to start their season much earlier than they had in previous years and played their first game in November.

Unfortunately, it took a long time for the Leopards to play their second game and didn't hit the ice against until February. They did, however, use the off time well and performed much better than their rivals, Lehigh. Though Lafayette won the game, they received some unwelcome new that star defenseman, Frank Murphy, may be recalled by the Royal Canadian Air Force and be lost for the year. While Murphy remained with the team, he wasn't able to help them stave off defeat from their next two opponents. Lafayette dropped both games and ended up finishing near the bottom of the league standings.

After the season, a team made up of players from both Lafayette and Lehigh travelled to Philadelphia where they lost to a similar all-star squad 3–2.

Roster

Standings

Schedule and results

|-
!colspan=12 style=";" | Regular Season

References

External links

Lafayette
Lafayette
Lafayette
Lafayette